Duke of Algeciras, is a title of Spanish nobility that is accompanied by the dignity of Grandee of Spain. It was granted to Isabel Gutiérrez de Castro in 1906 by Alfonso XIII. The title was granted in honor of the first duchess's late son, Juan Manuel Sanchez y Gutiérrez de Castro, who was married to the Duchess of Almodóvar del Río.

Dukes of Algeciras (1906)
 Isabel Gutiérrez de Castro y Cossío, 1st Duchess of Algeciras (1817-1907)
 María de las Mercedes de Hoyos y Sánchez, 2nd Duchess of Algeciras (1904-1984), eldest daughter of the 11th Duchess of Almodóvar del Río, granddaughter of the 1st Duchess
 Ricardo López de Carrizosa y Hoyos, 3rd Duke of Algeciras (1932-2013), eldest son of the 2nd Duchess
 Carlos López de Carrizosa y Mitjans, 4th Duke of Algeciras (b. 1959), eldest son of the 3rd Duke

See also
List of dukes in the peerage of Spain
List of current Grandees of Spain

References 

Dukedoms of Spain
Grandees of Spain
Lists of dukes
Lists of Spanish nobility